Hørning station is a railway station serving the suburb of Hørning south of the city of Aarhus in East Jutland, Denmark.

The station is located on the Fredericia-Aarhus Line from Fredericia to Aarhus. It offers regional train services to Aarhus, Esbjerg, Herning and Skjern. The train services are operated by the railway company Arriva.

See also
 List of railway stations in Denmark

References

Citations

Bibliography

External links

 Banedanmark – government agency responsible for maintenance and traffic control of most of the Danish railway network
 Arriva – British multinational public transport company operating bus and train services in Denmark
 Danske Jernbaner – website with information on railway history in Denmark

Railway stations in Aarhus